This is a list of seasons completed by the Duke Blue Devils football team. Representing Duke University, the Blue Devils compete in the Coastal Division of the Atlantic Coast Conference in the NCAA Division I FBS. Since 1929, Duke has played their home games out of Wallace Wade Stadium in Durham, North Carolina. The Blue Devils began playing football as an independent in 1888, though the school did not field a team from 1895 to 1919. In 1930, the program joined the Southern Conference, where they captured nine conference titles in 22 years. The Blue Devils joined the ACC as a charter member in 1953, and have competed in the conference ever since.

Duke's primary rival is the North Carolina Tar Heels. The series dates back to 1888, and has been played annually since 1922. The teams compete for the Victory Bell. As of the 2018 season, North Carolina holds a 59–39–4 lead in the series.

Seasons

Notes

References

Duke Blue Devils

Duke Blue Devils football seasons